Bon Voyage Sim  is a 1966 film.

Synopsis 
Sim, the President of a Republic of Toads, goes on a journey invited by a neighboring president. When he returns, he is dethroned and thrown into the water by his compatriots.

External links 

1966 films
Nigerien drama films